Taeniophyllum malianum, commonly known as the tangled ribbonroot, is a species of leafless epiphytic or lithophytic orchid that forms tangled clumps. It has flattened green roots with irregular white spots and pressed against the substrate on which it is growing. There are up to fifteen fragrant yellow, short-lived flowers with up to three open at the same time. It only occurs in tropical North Queensland and in New Guinea.

Description
Taeniophyllum malianum is a leafless, epiphytic or lithophytic herb that forms untidy, tangled clumps. No more than three flowers are open at the same time. Flowering occurs sporadically and the flowers only last less than a day.

Taxonomy and naming
Taeniophyllum malianum was first formally described in 1913 by Rudolf Schlechter and the description was published in Repertorium specierum novarum regni vegetabilis. Beihefte.

Distribution and habitat
The tangled ribbonroot grows in humid scrub and rainforest. It occurs in New Guinea and Queensland where it is found between the McIlwraith and Iron Ranges.

References

malianum
Endemic orchids of Australia
Orchids of Queensland
Plants described in 1913